Romania have appeared at five UEFA European Championships, between 1984 and 2016. Their best performance so far was reaching the quarter-finals of Euro 2000, when they were eliminated by eventual tournament runners-up Italy.

Euro 1984

Group stage

Euro 1996

Group stage

Euro 2000

Group stage

Knockout stage

Quarter-finals

Euro 2008

Group stage

Euro 2016

Group stage

Overall record

*Denotes draws including knockout matches decided via penalty shoot-out.
**Red border colour indicates that the tournament was held on home soil.

References

Countries at the UEFA European Championship
Euro
Romania at the UEFA European Championship